The First Presbyterian Church in the City of Philadelphia, Pennsylvania, is located on 21st and Walnut Streets, built in an array of architectural styles of leading Philadelphia architects.  The First Presbyterian Church is located within the Rittenhouse Fitler Historic District.

History 

The First Presbyterian Church in the City of Philadelphia, also known as 'First Church', was organized around 1692. Religious services began in a building known as the "Barbadoes Warehouse", located on the northwest corner of Second and Chestnut Streets. For a time, both Baptists and Congregationalists shared this facility with the Presbyterians.

In 1704, the congregation moved to the south side of High Street (now Market Street) at the corner of Bank Street. Here the first Presbyterian church in Philadelphia was established. Then, in 1793, it was renovated and made more spacious and elegant. Twenty-seven years later it was abandoned, due to unsafe conditions and the encroachment of the surrounding business district.

A new church was erected at Washington Square (Seventh and Locust Streets). At this church, in 1837, came the formation of the New School Assembly, from which emerged the Second Church.

During the 1920s, the church decided to relocate again partially due to the decay of city's Old City historic area. In 1929, the congregation merged with Calvary Presbyterian Church and moved to Locust Street near Fifteenth Street. The merged congregation kept the name First Presbyterian Church.

When the historic First and Second Presbyterian Churches in the City of Philadelphia joined to form one church in 1949, the united congregation adopted the name of the First Church (founded in 1698) and occupied the fourth building of the Second Church (founded 1743). The architect Henry Augustus Sims designed the present building at 21st and Walnut Streets and attended the dedication in October 1872.

Inter-generational reading program for children and older retirees "Reading Buddies" was founded by First Church and member Mrs. Patricia Pfeiffer Quigg in 1968. The program continued for 50 years until 2018, upon Quigg's retirement, before her passing in 2020. Quigg was honored by AARP in 2007 as Volunteer of the Year in Pennsylvania for her efforts. 

During the early years of the AIDS global pandemic, First Church founded MANNA in 1990 to feed sick neighbors within the city limits dying from AIDS and to provide support to those most in need of nourishment.  MANNA has grown into an independent organization housed now in the Spring Garden district and fulfilling the nourishment needs of neighbors with many health ailments with the mantra "Food Is Medicine".    

In June 2018 First Church elected and installed the 17th and the first openly gay pastor The Rev. Dr. Baron A. Mullis.    

In March 2020 as the global COVID-19 pandemic surged First Church canceled all in-person activity, including Sunday church services.  For the better part of a two years, services were held online and continue to this day in a hybrid format (both in person and online) to meet the needs of all church members.  

On Sunday, October 23, 2022, First Church celebrated the 150th anniversary of the current church building at South 21st Street (Formerly Second Presbyterian Church). 

In 2023, First Church hosted events throughout the year to celebrate the 325th anniversary of the mother church of presbyterianisim within the United States starting with the founding of First Presbyterian Church in the City of Philadelphia.

The interior details
The interior of the church building has many fine design elements and admirable craftsmanship. The stone carvings were done in place from raw Ohio stone provided by William Armstrong of Philadelphia. Henry Augustus Sims traveled extensively in the area and noted exceptional work. The two stone carvers he recommended to the Church Building Committee were recent immigrants to America. They had come with letters of introduction and their first collaboration involved finishing the carvings in a small church in Delaware which Sims admired. Both men arrived from Great Britain and they left their distinctive marks on many American buildings. Alexander Milne Calder (1846-1923) and John William Kitson (1845–1888) spent nearly two years completing the interior, the exterior follies and the two elaborate doorway carvings. Calder's work attracted the attention of some important men in Philadelphia and led directly to his appointment as a carver for the Philadelphia City Hall project which was capped by Calder's famous statue of William Penn. The City Hall project consumed a good portion of Calder's working career, but he completed other noted works for tombs and commemorative statues, including one of General Meade now located in Fairmount Park. Kitson's work at Second Church established his reputation as an artist known for interior stonework and especially bird carving. He left Philadelphia and formed the New York City firm of Ellin and Kitson. Some of their later works there include the Tilden Home, the William Vanderbilt Home, The Equitable Insurance Building, Grace Church and Trinity Church.

Stained glass windows 
The oldest stained glass windows were in place in 1872; the newest ones were dedicated in 1988. A wide range of makers and styles appears.

East transept and aisle

The three floor level windows 
The first of the three floor level windows at the south end of the east transept was placed in memory of Robert Hobart Smith, ordained an elder of the Second Church in 1827. It was placed in the church in 1872 when the building was dedicated and is attributed to J. & G.H. Gibson of Philadelphia. The center medallion displays the IHS monogram. This ancient symbol derives from the first three letters of the name Jesus in uppercase Greek characters, here transliterated into Gothic script. The middle window, also by Gibson and dated from 1872, memorializes James Hunter Cole who died in 1844. At the top of the lancet, a Greek cross surmounted by a crown symbolizes the victory of the cross. The oval center medallion bears a text from Isaiah, "In the Lord have I righteousness and strength". In the bottom panel, the Bible is opened to the text at Isaiah 45:24. The left-most window of this group, also attributed to Gibson and dated from 1872, was placed in memory of Robert Smith, an elder who died in 1838. The center medallion contains an anchor forming a cross. The anchor cross is an ancient Christian symbol found in early tombs, signifying hope as the anchor of faith. The derivation comes from Hebrews 6:19, in which 'hope' is described as the anchor of our lives.

The Snowden Window
The southernmost window in the east aisle, by Magee & Smith of Philadelphia, was placed in 1872. It memorializes Isaac Snowden, a ruling elder who died in 1835. The top trefoil contains the crown and palms of victory over death. The medallions in the lights bear a text from Psalm 37:37, "Mark the perfect man, and behold the upright, for the end of that man is peace". Next to the Snowden window is a marble plaque in memory of George Whitefield and Gilbert Tennent, the founders of the Second Church. The tablet hung behind the pulpit of the Second Church when it was located at Seventh and Arch Streets. It is the only relic preserved from that building.

The Alice Niles Miller Window
The Alice Niles Miller window was placed in 1872. It was the work of Wailles of Newcastle upon Tyne and Spence of Montreal. In the left lights, a standing angel holds a scythe and a sheaf of wheat, symbolizing a life cut down. On the right, an angel holds palm branches and a crown representing victory over death. In the quatrefoil, at the top, a seated angel holds the text, "She has done what she could". These are the Lord's words from the story of the woman who poured precious fragrance over Jesus' head in Mark 14:8.

Mary Grier Bartol Window
The Mary Grier Bartol window was placed in 1965 by Willet Studios of Philadelphia. The scriptural text in the trefoil quotes Isaiah 33:17, "Thine eyes shall see the King in his beauty". The standing angel on the left holds lilies, a symbol of the resurrection, while the angel on the right holds a palm signifying victory over death.

Emily B. McFadden Window
The window, placed in memory of Emily B. McFadden, is a 1914 signed piece by Tiffany Studios of New York. Two angels with raised arms are seated in the resurrection garden. This work displays several features typical of the Tiffany style: opalescent glass, streaky (Kokomo) glass, drapery glass and plating. The narrow joints between the leaves in the foliage are copper foil, rather than the wider lead panes joining the glass section in other church windows.

Two-light lancet
The ornamental two-light lancet in the east wall of the northeast tower stairs was installed by Gibson of Philadelphia when the building was dedicated in 1872. The two lights are filled with machine-textured diamond panes. The color of the stylized rose at the top is a good example of silver stain, whereby silver nitrate applied to the surface of the glass before firing imparts a transparent yellow color. The rose is often a symbol of the nativity.

The Marie Louise Weightman Faries Window
The single-light window in the north wall of the northeast tower stairway is a memorial to Marie Louise Weightman Faries, who died in 1898. The subject is a draped angel figure, crowned by a golden halo, standing in a field of lilies. On the basis of similarities in style, color, and subject to the other windows in the Philadelphia area, this window has been attributed to Fannie Sweeney, whose work was shown in the 1893-94 exhibition of the Pennsylvania Academy of the Fine Arts, and among the Pennsylvania exhibits at the World's Columbian Exposition in 1893. Though This window has some characteristics of the Tiffany style, the Faries window more closely resembles known examples of Sweeney's work, such as the angel figure in the First Unitarian Church of Wilmington, Delaware.

West transept and aisle

The "Prophet Windows"
The seven Tiffany lancet windows in the west transept were donated by John M. Logan in 1906 in memory of his brothers, and represent Old Testament figures. The congregation knows them familiarly as the "Prophet Windows", but both prophets and patriarchs are included. Beginning on the left, the first is that of Abraham holding a pastoral staff in his left hand and a long knife in the right, symbolizing the intended sacrifice of his son, Isaac. The figure of Joseph in the next window is immediately recognizable because of the splendor of his many-colored coat. The prophet Samuel holds a pen. The figure of Moses has his left arm raised up in blessing, and the right arm holds the tablets of the Law. The iconography of Elijah is elusive, but he is holding the measure of meal miraculously renewed while he lodged with the widow of Zarephath (I Kings 17:8). In the next lancet, Isaiah holds the scrolls of prophecy. The prophet Daniel holds a scepter in the right hand, for he was a royal functionary and foretold the coming of the King. The left hand holds the scroll of the prophecy. A single piece of glass from the original window can be seen in the second of the cathedral glass windows above and to the right of these windows.

The Haseltine Window
The adjacent memorial window, by Gibson of Philadelphia, was placed in 1872 by Charles F. Haseltine, a member of the Building Committee. In the quatrefoil above, a crown signifies victory over death. The inscription comes from Revelation 2:10, "Be thou faithful unto death, and I will give thee a crown of life". The left light displays a sheaf of lilies, a symbol of the Resurrection. The purple flower on the right has been identified as the passion flower, said to contain all the symbols of the Lord's Passion.

Memorial tablet of Elias R. Beadle
Just beyond the Haseltine window is a Gothic memorial tablet in memory of Dr. Elias R. Beadle, minister of the Second Church during the construction of the building. Beadle traveled the world to study and collect minerals, seashells and other naturally produced items. Elements of the tablet reflect this interest.

The Sarah Coit Lanman Harmar Window
The next window is the north was placed by James L. Harmar in 1872 in memory of Sarah Coit Lanman Harmar, who died in 1869. The window, by Cox and Son of London, is an example of the Victorian interpretation of medieval style. In the trefoil at the top, an angelic trumpeter proclaims the Resurrection. The text comes from Luke 24: 5-6, "Why seek ye the living among the dead? He is not here but is risen". In the left-hand light, under a Gothic arch, are the three women at the tomb. One of them holds a jar of ointment with which to anoint the body of Jesus. In the account of Luke's Gospel, the women are Mary of Magdala, Mary the mother of James, and Joanna. In the right-hand light are two angel figures pointing to the empty tomb. Grave clothes lie in the foreground. The placement of this window occasioned great controversy, for it was the first in which figures appeared. Mr. Haseltine, who donated the window to the south, protested that figures in the windows were contrary to Presbyterian practice and a number of members shared the same viewpoint. Mr. Harmar of the committee countered that figures in windows were not graven images in the sense forbidden by the Second Commandment. He argued that we should beautify our churches just as we decorate our homes. A glance around the building proves that objection to figural windows was short-lived. Indeed, Haseltine relented when a compromise removed the depiction of a cross above the front door of the main entrance to the new church building and other concessions followed. Haseltine, though opposed to figural windows, was no artistic Philistine, for he was the proprietor of an art gallery on Chestnut Street. It was here that Thomas Eakins' great portrait of Dr. Samuel David Gross (The Gross Clinic) was first publicly exhibited. The powerful realism of this picture repelled many, but Haseltine had the foresight to show what is now regarded as one of the greatest works of American painting.

McFadden Memorial Tablet
The bronze and metal tablet encountered before the next window is the work of America's most famous iron sculptor, Samuel Yellin. The tablet is a memorial to McFadden. The intricate work in iron and the striking deep reds in the text and between the ironwork make it a well-known site for visiting art historians.

The "Parable Window"
The pictorial qualities of the "Parable Window" just to the north make it a favorite among our members. This 1873 work is a signed example of the work of Jean-Baptiste Capronnier of Brussels. It was placed in memory of Mr. and Mrs. James Vanuxem. The name is unusual and probably Flemish, perhaps accounting for the selection of a Belgian maker. No other local examples of this maker are known. In the top quatrefoil, Jesus tends his sheep. The quotation comes from John 10:14, "I am the Good Shepherd and know my sheep, and am known of mine". The top left and right hand panels depict the parable of the prodigal son tending pigs and being welcomed home by his father (Luke 15:11). The two middle panels show the Good Samaritan assisting the wounded traveler, while his donkey chews on a thistle (Luke 10:30). In the bottom two panels, Jesus admits the five bridesmaids who have saved oil for their lamps to the wedding feast, and sends the unprepared away (Matthew 25:1). Vanuxem was chairman of the City's Watering Committee. When the sculptor William Rush was commissioned in 1809 to execute an allegorical figure of the Schuylkill River called Nymph and Bittern to adorn Benjamin Henry Latrobe's new waterworks in Centre Square, the Vanuxems' pretty daughter Nancy was the model for the figure. This statue, later cast in bronze, can be seen in the American Art Section of the Philadelphia Museum of Art.

The Ferdinand Wakefield Hubbell Window
In 1874, Mrs. Hubbell donated $500 in pew scrip and declared her intention of placing a window in memory of her husband, Ferdinand Wakefield Hubbell, adjacent to the Twenty-First Street tower door. In the better financial times of 1889, the Trustees acknowledged her intention. The date of this window is thus fixed no earlier than 1889. Although the window is reminiscent of the style of the American artist John LaFarge, there is no documentation that this window is a work of that artist - neither in church records nor in those of the LaFarge Studio. When the artist's son, Henry, viewed the window in 1974, he remained skeptical that his father designed it, but others can point out the stylistic similarities. Further research may clarify the origin of this window. Nonetheless, the window is striking in its bold colors. In the trefoil above, an angel holds the legend, "An Honorable Counselor". This is not a scriptural text, but probably reflects Hubbell's profession. On the left, the standing figure of St. Paul, portrayed as is customary as a short, bald, bearded man, holds the sword of the spirit in his right hand and the scroll of the epistles in his left hand. On the right, the figure of Moses, who alone appears twice in these windows, holds the tablets of the Law. This panel was once damaged and repaired.

Tower Window
The recently restored window in the tower vestibule was placed by Gibson when the building was dedicated in 1872. This is a two-light lancet of simple design, filled with diamond panes of machine-textured glass stenciled with lilies in black paint. The diagonal bands quote Psalm 100:4, "Enter into His gates with thanksgiving, and into His courts with praise. Be thankful and bless His name".

Center aisle, chancel and library

The Whitfield Window
The large four-light lancet window in the Walnut Street (north) wall is the largest in the building rising 31'6" above the floor below.  The architect Henry A. Sims proposed to fill this opening with stained glass, and several designs were considered. We know that the window was executed by the Philadelphia firm of Magee & Smith in 1872, and that is separated the sections of the organ by Simmons of Boston. When the first organ was replaced in 1906 by a Hutchings-Votey instrument, the window opening was completely boarded over, and the window disappeared from view for over ninety years. Thomas Edison visited the church for a lecture and his company designed and installed bright lights to illuminate the windows. When the organ had to be removed in 1999 for repair both the window and the organ were found to be in perilous states. Now restored, the large colorful window features the Shield of the Holy Trinity at the top, displaying the Athanasian Creed in Latin. This device also appears in stone above the Walnut Street doors. Lettering in the tops of the lower lancet quotes Revelation 4:8 and reads "Holy, Holy, Holy, Lord God Almighty, Which Was and Is and Is to Come." The two remaining quatrefoils contain rejoicing angels blowing trumpets. Sims refers to this as the “Whitfield Window” indicating it honored one of the early preachers of Second Church.

Clerestory windows
In the clerestory of the nave are twenty-four single-light lancet windows arranged in eight groups of three. The Trustees' Minutes of March 1872 record acceptance of a bid for glass in the clerestory at $25 per window. The maker is not documented, but it is probably a Philadelphian and likely the work of Gibson since the only unaccounted payments for glassworks were to the firm. Each of these ornamental windows has a Gothic arch at the top, beneath which are seven rows of five square medallions stenciled with black paint. The bottom panels contain Greek crosses in two different designs. The middle panel of each group can be opened by a pulley and chain. A number of repairs are visible including one which employs glass from the original transept windows when the Tiffany windows were installed in 1906.

The rose windows
The rose windows in the east and west transept arches were installed when the building was completed in 1872 and are attributed to Gibson. In each, elaborate stone tracery enclosed a central eight-lobed multi-foil surrounded by eight quatrefoils. These are filled with decorated, patterned glass in color similar design in the two windows.

The five high chancel windows
The five high chancel windows in the apse were manufactured by Wailles of Newcastle upon Tyne and installed when the building was completed in 1872. They were the gift of Theodore Cuyler in memory of his father, The Reverend Cornelius C. Cuyler, minister of Second Church 1834-1850. These windows are glorious whether seen in daylight or illuminated from outside at night. The total effect is enhanced by their location and unified design. The lower portion of the windows reflects the glory of Solomon's Temple said to have been dazzling in jewels. Jewel toned stained glass windows often represent this connection to the Old Testament.The south-facing location ensures that the windows receive maximum daylight. The subtle change in color from one to another creates a harmonious effect. The quinquefoils at the tops of the lancets exemplify sentinel features of the life of Christ and of the church year as well. Binoculars are recommended for study of these windows. Beginning at the left above the pulpit, the Epiphany Star is surrounded by a choir of seven angels and the text from Luke 2:14, "Glory to God in the highest, on earth peace,; goodwill toward men". In the next window to the right, the dove descends over the water of Jesus' baptism. The surrounding text from Matthew 3:17 reads, "This is my beloved Son, in whom I am well pleased." The center window at the back of the chancel displays a Latin or Roman cross and the instruments of crucifixion: the lance and the sponge on a pole. The text from Matthew 27:54 reads, "Truly this was the Son of God." To the right is the phoenix, an unusual but ancient symbol of the Resurrection. This mythical bird was said to live for five hundred years before being consumed by fire. It was then reborn from its ashes. The phoenix is surrounded by the text from Luke 24: 34 which is also the response to the Easter salutation, "The Lord is risen indeed".

The Rev. Dr. J. Ernest Somerville Window
The library windows by Willet Studios of Philadelphia were given by the congregation in 1988 in memory of The Rev. Dr. J. Ernest Somerville, minister of the church for thirty years before his death in 1986. In the larger window, an open door surrounds a Celtic cross with outward rays of light. The text from Revelation 3:8 recalls a theme of Somerville's ministry, "Behold I have set before you an open door". The Celtic cross and the Abbey of Iona below signify Somerville's Scottish origin and his connection with the Iona community.

The Dove Window
The smaller window, high on the right, contains a descending dove and a rose blossoming from the ground. The dove is both a symbol of the Holy Spirit and of St. Colomba, who brought Christianity to Scotland from across the Irish Sea. The blossoming rose reminds us of Michael Praetorius' Christmas chorale, "Lo, how a rose e'er blooming". The rose thus signifies the life-giving spilled blood of Christ.

List of Pastors

Archival collections
The Presbyterian Historical Society has a collection of miscellaneous items dealing with the development and growth of the First Presbyterian Church. The materials at the historical society include session minutes, correspondence, baptism and marriage records, pew rentals, cemetery information, cash books, as well as other items related to the history and business of the church.

References

External links

First Presbyterian Church in Philadelphia website
Presbyterian Historical Society Collection

Churches in Philadelphia
Presbyterian churches in Pennsylvania
Churches completed in 1871
Religious organizations established in 1698
Rittenhouse Square, Philadelphia
1698 establishments in Pennsylvania